The canton of Tourrette-Levens (French: Canton de Tourrette-Levens) is an administrative division of the southeastern Alpes-Maritimes department, Provence-Alpes-Côte d'Azur region, France. It was created at the French canton reorganisation which came into effect in March 2015. Its seat is in Tourrette-Levens. In the 2021 election, MP Éric Ciotti and Rimplas Mayor Christelle D'Intorni of The Republicans were elected.

It consists of the following communes:

Aspremont
Belvédère
La Bollène-Vésubie
Castagniers
Clans
Colomars
Duranus
Falicon
Ilonse
Isola
Lantosque
Levens
Marie
Rimplas
Roquebillière
Roubion
Roure
La Roquette-sur-Var
Saint-Blaise
Saint-Dalmas-le-Selvage
Saint-Étienne-de-Tinée
Saint-Martin-du-Var
Saint-Martin-Vésubie
Saint-Sauveur-sur-Tinée
Tourrette-Levens
Utelle
Valdeblore
Venanson

References

Cantons of Alpes-Maritimes